Akhmeta is a town in Kakheti (Georgia) and is the administrative centre of Akhmeta Municipality. It's situated on the left side of Alazani, close to the Pankisi Gorge. The town is situated at 567m. In 1966, it received the status of Kalaki.

On January 31, 1812, the villagers of this town revolted against the Russians and sparked a massive uprising all across Kakheti.

See also
 Kakheti
 Telavi
 Tsinandali

References

External links
 Official website of Kakheti region
 Official website of Akhmeta municipality

Cities and towns in Kakheti
Tiflis Governorate